The 2018 Michigan Wolverines football team represented the University of Michigan in the sport of college football during the 2018 NCAA Division I FBS football season. The Wolverines were members of the East Division of the Big Ten Conference and played their home games at Michigan Stadium in Ann Arbor, Michigan. Michigan was coached by Jim Harbaugh, who was in his fourth season as head coach of his alma mater.

Michigan began the year ranked 14th in both the AP Poll and Coaches Poll. Its first game of the year was on the road against rival Notre Dame, the first meeting between the two schools since 2014. The Wolverines lost that game, 24–17. Michigan won its next ten games, however, including wins over then-ranked Big Ten opponents Michigan State, Wisconsin, and Penn State, all of whom beat Michigan the previous year. The team rallied around calling the season a "revenge tour". The Wolverines climbed to fourth in the College Football Playoff rankings, and would have clinched the Big Ten Eastern Division and a spot in the 2018 Big Ten Football Championship Game with a regular-season-ending win over arch-rival Ohio State. However, the revenge tour came to an abrupt end as Michigan lost, 62–39, its seventh consecutive loss to the Buckeyes and 14th loss in 15 years in the series. The Wolverines were selected to their second New Year's Six bowl in three years, the Peach Bowl, where they lost to Florida, 41–15. The team's final record was 10–3, Harbaugh's third ten-win season in four years, and the team finished exactly where it started in the polls, at 14th.

Michigan was led on offense by junior quarterback Shea Patterson, a transfer from Ole Miss, and running back Karan Higdon, who became the first Michigan running back to rush for 1,000 yards since Fitzgerald Toussaint in 2011. On defense, the Wolverines were led by linebacker Devin Bush Jr., who was a consensus All-American and won the Nagurski–Woodson Award as the Big Ten's defensive player of the year. Five Michigan defensive players were named first-team All-Big Ten by the coaches: Bush, defensive linemen Rashan Gary and Chase Winovich, and defensive backs Lavert Hill and David Long.

Preseason
In January 2018, the Wolverines hired Ben Herbert as Director of Strength and Conditioning, and Sherrone Moore as tight ends coach. On February 20, 2018, the Wolverines hired Jim McElwain as wide receivers coach. On February 23, Tim Drevno resigned as offensive coordinator after three seasons. The offensive coordinator position remained vacant throughout the 2018 season, with play calling duties split among the offensive coaches in what coach Harbaugh described as a "collaborative effort", with passing game coordinator Pep Hamilton calling a majority of the plays.

Award watch lists
Listed in the order that they were released

Recruiting

Position key

Recruits
Michigan's recruiting class consisted of 19 recruits, including three that enrolled early. Michigan's recruiting class was ranked No. 20 by ESPN, No. 24 by Rivals.com, and No. 21 by 247Sports.com's Composite Rankings.

Schedule

Rankings

Game summaries

at Notre Dame

Sources:

    
    
    
    
    
    

To open the season, Michigan travelled to South Bend, Indiana to face the Notre Dame Fighting Irish to resume its long-running rivalry after a three year hiatus.

Michigan lost to Notre Dame, 24–17. Notre Dame scored 14 points in the first quarter on a 13-yard touchdown run from Jafar Armstrong and a 43-yard touchdown pass from Brandon Wimbush to Chris Finke. Michigan responded with 10 points in the second quarter on a 28-yard field goal by Quinn Nordin and a 99-yard kickoff return by Ambry Thomas. Notre Dame extended its lead in the second quarter on a four-yard touchdown run from Armstrong, which made the score 21–10 in favor of Notre Dame at half-time. Notre Dame added a 48-yard field goal by Justin Yoon in the third quarter. Michigan reduced Notre Dame's lead to seven points following a three-yard touchdown run from Karan Higdon in the fourth quarter.

Thomas' 99-yard kickoff return was the third 99-yard kickoff return in program history, and first since Tyrone Wheatley in 1992. Michigan's defense held Notre Dame to only 69 yards on 29 plays and three points in the second half, and scoreless in the fourth quarter.

Western Michigan

Sources:

    
    
    
    
    
    
    

Following its opening game against Notre Dame, Michigan hosted the Western Michigan Broncos to open its home schedule. This was the first meeting between the schools since 2011, a game shortened by lightning.

Michigan won in a blowout, 49–3. Michigan scored 21 points in the first quarter on a 17-yard touchdown pass from Shea Patterson to Sean McKeon, a 67-yard touchdown run from Karan Higdon and a 27-yard touchdown run from Chris Evans. Michigan added 14 points in the second quarter on a two-yard touchdown run from Evans, and a 44-yard touchdown pass from Patterson to Nico Collins, which made the score 35–0 in favor of Michigan at half-time. Michigan extended its lead in the third quarter on a five-yard touchdown pass from Patterson to Donovan Peoples-Jones. Michigan added seven points in the fourth quarter on an 18-yard touchdown pass from Dylan McCaffrey to Jake McCurry. Western Michigan finally got on the board late in the fourth quarter with a 35-yard field goal by Josh Grant to avoid a shutout.

Michigan's honorary captains for the game were alumni Grant Newsome and Brenda Tracy. Michigan scored 21 points in the first quarter for the first time since 2016 against Illinois. Higdon's 140 rushing yards in the first quarter were the most by a Wolverine in a single quarter since Denard Robinson ran for 152 yards in the first quarter against Notre Dame in 2010. Michigan's defense held its opponent to single-digit points for the first time since allowing just a field goal to Maryland in 2016.

SMU

Sources:

    
    
    
    
    
    
    
    
    

After playing Western Michigan, Michigan hosted the SMU Mustangs.

Michigan defeated SMU 45–20. After neither team scored in the first quarter, Michigan scored on every offensive possession from the second quarter onward. The teams exchanged touchdowns on a one-yard touchdown run from Ben Mason for Michigan, and a 50-yard touchdown pass from Ben Hicks to James Proche for SMU to tie the game. Michigan responded with 14 points on a 35-yard touchdown pass from Shea Patterson to Donovan Peoples-Jones, and a 73-yard interception return from Josh Metellus as time expired in the first half, which made the score 21–7 in favor of Michigan at half-time. Michigan added 14 points in the third quarter on two touchdown receptions from Peoples-Jones, from seven-yards and 41-yards, respectively. SMU responded with a two-yard touchdown pass from William Brown to Ryan Becker. SMU opened the scoring in the fourth quarter on a two-yard touchdown pass from Brown to Proche. Michigan extended its lead with a 45-yard field goal by Quinn Nordin and a nine-yard touchdown run from Tru Wilson.

Peoples-Jones' three touchdowns were the most scored by a Wolverine wide receiver since Jehu Chesson scored four against Indiana in 2015. Metellus' 73-yard interception return was the sixth-longest interception return for a touchdown in program history and the longest since Brandon Herron's school-record 94-yard return against Western Michigan in 2011.

Nebraska

Sources:

    
    
    
    
    
    
    
    
    
    
    

Following its game against SMU, Michigan began its conference schedule when it hosted the Nebraska Cornhuskers.

Michigan won in a blowout, 56–10. Michigan scored 20 points in the first quarter on two touchdown runs by Ben Mason, from one and four-yards, respectively, and a 44-yard touchdown run from Karan Higdon. Michigan added 19 points in the second quarter, on a 50-yard field goal by Quinn Nordin, a five-yard touchdown pass from Shea Patterson to Zach Gentry, a one-yard touchdown run from Mason, and a safety for Michigan after an illegal forward pass by Adrian Martinez, which made the score 39–0 in favor of Michigan at half-time. Michigan added 10 points in the third quarter on a 60-yard punt return by Donovan Peoples-Jones and a 38-yard field by Nordin. Nebraska finally got on the board late in the third quarter with a 35-yard field goal by Barret Pickering to avoid a shutout. The teams exchanged touchdowns in the fourth quarter on a 56-yard touchdown pass from Dylan McCaffrey to Ronnie Bell for Michigan, and a three-yard touchdown run from Wyatt Mazour for Nebraska.

The 56 points scored were the fifth most in program history of Big Ten openers and the most since a 58–0 victory over Minnesota in 2011. Michigan's offense tallied over 200 yards rushing (285) and passing (206) for the first time since the 2017 season opener against Florida when the Wolverines had 215 yards rushing and 218 yards receiving. Michigan's defense held Nebraska to -5 yards in the first quarter and -1 yard in the second quarter. The last time the Michigan defense held an opponent to negative rushing yards in a quarter was against Ohio State in 2017. Quinn Nordin made a 50-yard field goal in the second quarter, his third career made field goal of at least 50 yards, tying Bob Bergeron (1984–87) for the second-most 50-yard field goals made in a career at Michigan.

at Northwestern

Sources:

    
    
    
    
    
    

After facing Nebraska, Michigan traveled to Evanston, Illinois, to face the Northwestern Wildcats.

Michigan defeated Northwestern 20–17. Northwestern scored ten points in the first quarter, on a one-yard touchdown run from Clayton Thorson and a 45-yard field goal by Charlie Kuhbande. Northwestern extended its lead in the second quarter on a three-yard touchdown run from John Moten IV. Michigan finally got on the board with a four-yard touchdown run from Karan Higdon, which made the score 17–7 in favor of Northwestern at half-time. In the second half, Michigan held Northwestern scoreless while accumulating 13 points. First a pair of field goals by Quinn Nordin from 23-yards and 24-yards, respectively in the third quarter, and a five-yard touchdown run from Higdon in the fourth quarter to give Michigan its first lead of the game, and the eventual win.

Michigan's 17-point comeback victory was its first since rallying for a 17-point comeback against Notre Dame in 2011. Northwestern had 105 total yards of offense in the first quarter, while Michigan's defense held them to just 97 yards in the final three quarters. Michigan's defense had season highs in sacks (six) and tackle-for-loss (10).

Maryland

Sources:

    
    
    
    
    
    
    
    
    

After its game against Northwestern, Michigan hosted the Maryland Terrapins in its homecoming game.

Following a 70-minute weather delay due to thunderstorms in the area, Michigan defeated Maryland 42–21. Michigan opened the scoring in the first quarter on a 34-yard field goal by Quinn Nordin. Maryland responded with a 98-yard kickoff return by Ty Johnson, to take its first and only lead of the game. Michigan scored 14 points in the second quarter on a one-yard run by Ben Mason and a 22-yard touchdown pass from Shea Patterson to Ronnie Bell, which made the score 17–7 in favor of Michigan at half-time. Michigan extended its lead in the third quarter on a 31-yard field goal by Nordin and a 34-yard touchdown pass from Patterson to Donovan Peoples-Jones. Michigan added 15 points in the fourth quarter on a seven-yard touchdown pass from Patterson to Jared Wangler, and a two-point conversion Mason run, and a 46-yard interception return by Brandon Watson. Maryland added 14 points on a one-yard run from Javon Leake, and a five-yard touchdown run from Tyrrell Pigrome.

Michigan's honorary captain for the game was former director of strength and conditioning Mike Gittleson. Running back Karan Higdon rushed for 103 yards, becoming the 23rd player in program history to surpass 2,000 career rushing yards (2,020). Michigan's defense, which entered the game leading the nation in total defense at 232.6 yards per game, held Maryland to 220 yards of total offense, nearly 180 yards less than its average of 399.8 entering the game.

Wisconsin

Sources:

Following its homecoming game against Maryland, Michigan hosted the Wisconsin Badgers.

Michigan defeated Wisconsin 38–13. After a scoreless first quarter, Michigan got on the board first with a two-yard touchdown run from Karan Higdon. Wisconsin responded with a 33-yard touchdown run from Kendric Pryor, for its only points of the first half, to tie the game. Michigan regained the lead following two field goals from Quinn Nordin from 42-yards and 33-yards, respectively, which made the score 13–7 in favor of Michigan at half-time. Michigan extended its lead in the third quarter on a seven-yard touchdown run from Shea Patterson, followed by a two-point conversion pass to Nico Collins. Michigan added 17 more points in the fourth quarter. First with a 35-yard field goal by Nordin, then a 21-yard interception return from Lavert Hill and a 44-yard touchdown run from Dylan McCaffrey. Wisconsin then scored its only points of the second half on a three-yard touchdown pass from Alex Hornibrook to A. J. Taylor.

Michigan's defense held Wisconsin to season-lows of 283 total yards, 100 passing yards and 183 rushing yards. Michigan held Wisconsin to just 2-of-11 (18.2 percent) on third-down conversions. Shea Patterson's 81-yard run early in the second quarter was Michigan's longest since Denard Robinson's 87-yard run against Notre Dame in 2010. It was tied for the 15th longest run from scrimmage in Michigan history and was the second longest run by a Michigan quarterback. Lavert Hill's 21-yard interception return for a touchdown was his second of his career, becoming the third player in Michigan program history to register two interception returns for touchdowns, following Lance Dottin and Thom Darden.

at Michigan State

After its game against Wisconsin, Michigan traveled to East Lansing to face its in-state rival, the Michigan State Spartans, in the battle for the Paul Bunyan Trophy.

Michigan defeated Michigan State 21–7. After a scoreless first quarter, Michigan scored first with a six-yard touchdown pass from Shea Patterson to Nico Collins, which made the score 7–0 in favor of Michigan at half-time. Michigan State opened the scoring in the second half on a four-yard touchdown pass from Darrell Stewart Jr. to Brian Lewerke to tie the game, for its only points of the game. Michigan responded with a 79-yard touchdown pass from Patterson to Donovan Peoples-Jones to re-gain the lead. Michigan extended its lead in the fourth quarter on a five-yard touchdown run from Ben Mason.

Michigan's defense held Michigan State to just 94 total yards of offense, including 15 yards rushing. This was its fewest total yards gained in a game since only having 56 total yards of offense in 1947, also against Michigan. Michigan State entered the game averaging 394.5 yards of offense. Michigan has held seven of eight opponents to their season low in yardage this year. Michigan State failed to convert a third-down attempt, going 0-for-12 during the game. The seven points scored by Michigan State were the fewest in a rivalry game against Michigan since 2002, when Michigan won 49–3. Karan Higdon finished the game with 139 rushing yards, his sixth consecutive game surpassing 100-yards. With the win, Michigan snapped a 17 game losing streak to ranked opponents on the road. The team went into its bye week with a 7–1 record.

Penn State

Sources:

After facing in-state rival Michigan State and having a bye week, Michigan hosted the Penn State Nittany Lions.

Michigan won in a blowout, 42–7. Michigan opened the scoring in the first quarter with a one-yard touchdown run from Shea Patterson. Michigan extended its lead in the second quarter on a 23-yard touchdown pass from Patterson to Donovan Peoples-Jones, which made the score 14–0 in favor of Michigan at half-time. Michigan added 14 points in the third quarter on a seven-yard touchdown pass from Patterson to Zach Gentry and a 62-yard interception return by Brandon Watson. Michigan added 14 more points in the fourth quarter on a four-yard touchdown run from Karan Higdon, and a one-yard touchdown run from Chris Evans. Penn State finally got on the board late in the fourth quarter on an eight-yard touchdown run from Tommy Stevens to avoid a shutout.

Michigan's honorary captains for the game were alumni Bryan and Kathleen Marshall, and former Michigan basketball star and Fab Five member Chris Webber. Michigan's defense held Penn State to just 77 total yards in the first half, and allowing just 186 total yards during the game. This marked an FBS-best eighth time allowing less than 100 yards in a half this season. Higdon rushed for 132 yards, his seventh consecutive game surpassing 100-yards. This is the second-longest streak in Michigan program history, trailing only Mike Hart's eight consecutive games with 100-yards rushing in 2007. With his interception return for a touchdown in the third quarter, Brandon Watson became the fourth player in program history with two or more interceptions returned for touchdowns, joining Lavert Hill, Thom Darden and Lance Dottin.

at Rutgers

Sources:

After hosting Penn State, Michigan traveled to Piscataway, New Jersey to face the Rutgers Scarlet Knights.

Michigan won in a blowout, 42–7. Michigan opened the scoring in the first quarter with a one-yard touchdown run from Karan Higdon. Rutgers responded with an 80-yard touchdown run from Isiah Pacheco to tie the game. Michigan responded with 35 unanswered points. Michigan added 14 points in the second quarter on a one-yard touchdown run from Higdon and a 36-yard touchdown pass from Shea Patterson to Nico Collins, which made the score 21–7 in favor of Michigan at half-time. Michigan again added 14 points in the third quarter on a 16-yard touchdown pass from Patterson to Oliver Martin, and a 10-yard touchdown pass from Patterson to Collins. Michigan added seven points in the fourth quarter on a 61-yard touchdown run from Chris Evans.

Michigan's defense allowed only 59 passing yards, the lowest by any team against Michigan this year. Michigan held Rutgers to just 4-of-12 on third-down conversions. Michigan tied a season-high with 24 first downs during the game. Higdon rushed for 42 yards, surpassing the 1,000-yard rushing mark in the second quarter. He became the first 1,000-yard running back for Michigan since Fitzgerald Toussaint in 2011, and the first player of any kind to rush for over 1,000 yards since Denard Robinson in 2012.

Indiana

Sources:

Following its game against Rutgers, Michigan played its final home game against Indiana.

Michigan defeated Indiana 31–20. Michigan opened the scoring in the first quarter with a 32-yard field goal by Jake Moody. Indiana responded with a 13-yard touchdown run from Stevie Scott, to take its first lead of the game. Michigan added 12 points during the second quarter on two field goals by Moody, from 30-yards, and 31-yards respectively, and a 41-yard touchdown pass from Shea Patterson to Nick Eubanks. Indiana added 10 points on a 41-yard field goal by Logan Justus and a seven-yard touchdown pass from Peyton Ramsey to Ty Fryfogle, which made the score 17–15 in favor of Indiana at half-time. Michigan added 10 points in the third quarter on a two-yard touchdown run from Karan Higdon and a 33-yard field goal by Moody to regain the lead. Michigan extended its lead in the fourth quarter on two more field goals by Moody, from 23-yards, and 29-yards, respectively. Indiana responded with a 32-yard field goal by Justus, for its only points of the second half.

Freshman kicker Jake Moody set a Michigan single-game record with six field goals, going 6-for-6 in his collegiate placekicking debut. Running back Karan Higdon recorded his eighth 100-yard game this season. Higdon's 100-yard game was the 13th of his career, tying him with Gordon Bell, Billy Taylor and Tim Biakabutuka for the eighth-most 100-yard rushing games during a career in Michigan program history.

at Ohio State

Following its home finale against Indiana, Michigan traveled to Columbus, Ohio to face its arch-rival, the Ohio State Buckeyes, in the 115th playing of "The Game".

Michigan was defeated by Ohio State 62–39. Ohio State opened the scoring in the first quarter with a 24-yard touchdown pass from Dwayne Haskins to Chris Olave. Michigan responded with a 39-yard field goal by Jake Moody. Michigan scored 16 points in the second quarter on a 31-yard field goal by Moody, a 23-yard touchdown pass from Shea Patterson to Nico Collins, and a nine-yard touchdown pass from Patterson to Chris Evans. Ohio State scored 17 points in the quarter on a 24-yard touchdown pass from Haskins to Olave, a 31-yard touchdown pass from Haskins to Johnnie Dixon and a 19-yard field goal by Blake Haubeil as time expired, which made the score 24–19 in favor of Ohio State at half-time. Ohio State added 17 points in the third quarter on a 19-yard field goal by Haubeil, a 33-yard punt return by Sevyn Banks and a two-yard touchdown run from Mike Weber. Michigan scored 20 points in the fourth quarter on a 12-yard touchdown pass from Patterson to Collins, a one-yard touchdown run from Ben Mason, and a four-yard touchdown run from Joe Milton. Ohio State added 21 points on a 78-yard touchdown run from Parris Campbell, a one-yard touchdown pass from Haskins to K. J. Hill, and a 16-yard touchdown pass from Haskins to Campbell.

Michigan finished as co-champions of the Big Ten East Division with an 8–1 record in conference play, for its first division title since the conference introduced divisions in 2011. This was its best conference record since going 7–1 in 2004.

vs. Florida (Peach Bowl)

 Sources:

On December 2, Michigan was selected to play in the Peach Bowl against the Florida Gators. Michigan won the previous meeting in the 2017 Advocare Classic, by a score of 33–17. This was Michigan's 47th bowl game appearance, and its first appearance in the Peach Bowl.

Florida defeated Michigan 41–15. Florida opened the scoring in the first quarter with a 21-yard field goal by Evan McPherson. Michigan responded with a nine-yard touchdown pass from Shea Patterson to Donovan Peoples-Jones. Michigan extended its lead in the second quarter on a 48-yard field goal by Jake Moody. Florida added ten points in the quarter on a 26-yard field goal by McPherson and a 20-yard touchdown run from Feleipe Franks, which made the score 13–10 in favor of Florida at half-time. Florida added 14 points in the third quarter on a five-yard touchdown pass from Franks to La'Mical Perine, and a one-yard touchdown run from Jordan Scarlett. Michigan added five points in the fourth quarter on a 26-yard field goal by Moody and a safety. Florida extended its lead on a 53-yard touchdown run from Perine and a 30-yard interception return from C. J. Gardner-Johnson.

Roster

Awards and honors

2019 NFL Draft

The 2019 NFL Draft was held on April 25–27, 2019 in Nashville, Tennessee. Five Wolverines were selected as part of the draft, and another six signed with NFL teams as undrafted free agents.

Former Michigan starting quarterback Wilton Speight, who grad transferred to UCLA before the 2018 season, also signed as an undrafted free agent with the San Francisco 49ers.

References

External links

Michigan
Michigan Wolverines football seasons
Michigan Wolverines football